Marta Torrejón Moya (born 27 February 1990) is a Spanish professional footballer who plays as a defender for FC Barcelona.
She formerly captained the Spain women's national football team, making 90 appearances and scoring 8 goals.

Club career
Torrejón debuted in the Superliga Femenina for Espanyol at just 14 years old. In 2011, she started in the final of the Copa de la Reina de Fútbol, where they lost in extra time versus her future club, Barcelona.

Two years later, at age 23, she signed for FC Barcelona and is currently the club's third captain.

Torrejón has won three league titles and three Copas de la Reina with Barcelona.

In the 2016–17 season, Barcelona reached the semi-finals of the UEFA Women's Champions League for the first time in the club's history. They were knocked out 5–1 on aggregate by Paris Saint Germain, where Torrejón started both matches.

In the 2018–19 season, she played an integral role in Barcelona's defense as they made it to the final of the UEFA Women's Champions League for the first time in the club's history. Torrejón started both games versus Bayern, where Barcelona won 2–0 on aggregate.
On 18 May 2019, Torrejón started in FCB Femení's first ever UWCL final versus Lyon, who went on to win the match 4–1.

In 2020, Torrejón featured for both matches in the first edition of the Supercopa Femenina. In the final against Real Sociedad, she scored 4 of Barcelona's 10 goals and was named MVP of the tournament.

International career
Torrejón made her senior Spain national team debut in November 2007, a 1–0 defeat to England in Shrewsbury.

In June 2013 national team coach Ignacio Quereda selected Torrejón in the squad for UEFA Women's Euro 2013 in Sweden. She played every minute of Spain's campaign, which ended with a 3–1 defeat to Norway in the quarter-finals.

She was part of Spain's squad for the 2015 FIFA Women's World Cup in Canada, playing every minute of the team's campaign. After Spain's poor performance of two losses and a draw in the group stages, she and her 22 teammates from the tournament called for coach Ignacio Quereda's resignation from the national team.

She played two games at the 2019 FIFA Women's World Cup in France. The match against Germany would end up being her final appearance for Spain.

After the 2019 Women's World Cup, she announced her retirement from the national team on Twitter. She retired with the most ever caps for a Spanish women's national team player with 90. Her record was later surpassed by Alexia Putellas on 26 October 2021.

Personal life
Her brother Marc Torrejón is a former footballer.

Career statistics

Honours

Espanyol
 Primera División: 2005–06
 Copa de la Reina: 2006, 2009, 2010, 2012
 Copa Catalunya: 2005, 2006, 2007, 2008

Barcelona
 Primera División: 2013–14, 2014–15, 2019–20, 2020-21, 2021–22
UEFA Women's Champions League: 2020–21;
 Copa de la Reina: 2014, 2017, 2018, 2019–20, 2020–21, 2021–22
 Supercopa de España Femenina: 2019–20, 2021–22
 Copa Catalunya: 2015, 2016, 2017, 2018, 2019

Spain
 Algarve Cup: 2017
 Cyprus Cup: 2018

References

External links
 
 
 Marta Torrejón at FC Barcelona
 Marta Torrejón at BDFutbol
 
 
 

1990 births
Living people
Spanish women's footballers
Spain women's international footballers
Footballers from Catalonia
Primera División (women) players
FC Barcelona Femení players
RCD Espanyol Femenino players
People from Mataró
Sportspeople from the Province of Barcelona
Women's association football defenders
2015 FIFA Women's World Cup players
2019 FIFA Women's World Cup players
Sportswomen from Catalonia
UEFA Women's Euro 2017 players
Spain women's youth international footballers